Xiqin Manchu Ethnic Township is an ethnic township for Manchu people under the administration of Shuangcheng District in Harbin, Heilongjiang province, China. , it has 8 villages under its administration.

See also 
 List of township-level divisions of Heilongjiang

References 

Township-level divisions of Heilongjiang
Harbin
Manchu people